Franz Asplmayr (1 April 1728 – 29 July 1786) was an Austrian composer and violinist. There are many variants of his name, including Franz Aspelmayr, Franz Aschpellmayr and Franz Appelmeyer. He is best known for an opera on Greek myths, and for a few symphonies and string trios of his which were attributed to Joseph Haydn at one time. Among the few scholars who have studied his music, there are differing opinions as to the quality. J. Murray Barbour, for one, deems Asplmayr's 80 minuets "scored mostly for oboes, horns, and strings, without violas," that "all are extremely boring, as if written between beers." Temperly, on the other hand, finds advances "with respect to harmony and developmental techniques."

Asplmayr was born in Linz. His father taught him violin and by the 1750s he had steady employment playing violin in Vienna. In 1761 he took over Christoph Willibald Gluck's duty of writing ballet music for the German troupe. Although he was paid to write symphonies, few of those scores have survived to our time.

References

External links
 

1728 births
1786 deaths
Austrian male composers
Austrian composers
Austrian classical violinists
Male classical violinists
18th-century composers
18th-century Austrian male musicians